Lisa Ferrero (born November 3, 1982) is an American professional golfer who played on the LPGA Tour and Futures Tour.

Personal
Ferrero was born in Stockton, California on November 3, 1982. She resides in Lodi, California.

Amateur and college career
Ferrero won the U.S. Girls' Junior in 2000. Ferrero played college golf at University of Texas at Austin.  She graduated with a bachelor's degree in Sports Management.

Professional
Ferrero turned professional in 2005, and joined the Futures Tour on January 28, 2005. She joined the LPGA Tour in 2007 as a rookie.

Coaching career
On August 23, 2017, Ferrero was named Towson University women's golf head coach.

Professional wins (2)

Futures Tour wins (2)

References

External links

American female golfers
Texas Longhorns women's golfers
LPGA Tour golfers
College golf coaches in the United States
Golfers from California
Sportspeople from Stockton, California
People from Lodi, California
1982 births
Living people